Todor Kolev (born 8 February 1980) is a Bulgarian footballer who plays as a forward for Etar Veliko Tarnovo II. On 27 November 2019 he gets into a fight with the Etar Veliko Tarnovo's first team player – Ivan Stoyanov during squad training.

Career
Kolev started to play football at Etar Veliko Tarnovo. In 1999, when he was 19 years old, he was transferred to Levski Sofia, with whom he was Champion of Bulgaria in 1999–00 and won the 2000 Bulgarian Cup. Kolev made his competitive debut for Levski on 27 October 1999 against FC Iskar in the first round of the Bulgarian Cup, scoring three goals.

In June 2000, he was loaned to Spartak Pleven. In the 2001–02 season, Kolev earned 23 appearances playing in the Bulgarian top division, scoring 18 goals.

In the summer of 2002, he returned to Levski and won the 2003 Bulgarian Cup.

In January 2005, Kolev was loaned to Marek Dupnitsa. Five months later, Slavia Sofia signed Kolev on a five-year deal. In the 2006–07 season, he scored the 25 goals in 28 league matches.

In June 2007, Kolev relocated to Germany, signing a contract with TSV Alemannia Aachen. In the 2007–08 season, he earned 20 appearances playing in the 2nd Bundesliga, scoring five goals.

In August 2008, Kolev returned to Slavia Sofia.

In December 2010, Kolev signed with Ludogorets Razgrad and played for the team during the second half of the 2010/2011 season.

In September 2012, Kolev left Etar 1924 to sign with Olympiakos Volou.

In February 2017, Kolev returned to Etar Veliko Tarnovo.

Honours
Levski Sofia
 Champion of Bulgaria: 1999–2000
 Bulgarian Cup: 1999–2000, 2002–03

References

External links
 
 Profile at LevskiSofia.info

Living people
1980 births
People from Veliko Tarnovo
Sportspeople from Veliko Tarnovo Province
Bulgarian footballers
Association football forwards
First Professional Football League (Bulgaria) players
FC Etar Veliko Tarnovo players
PFC Levski Sofia players
PFC Spartak Pleven players
PFC Marek Dupnitsa players
PFC Slavia Sofia players
Alemannia Aachen players
2. Bundesliga players
Hapoel Ironi Kiryat Shmona F.C. players
PFC Ludogorets Razgrad players
FC Etar 1924 Veliko Tarnovo players
FC Hebar Pazardzhik players
SFC Etar Veliko Tarnovo players
Olympiacos Volos F.C. players
Bulgarian expatriate footballers
Expatriate footballers in Germany
Expatriate footballers in Israel
Expatriate footballers in Greece
Bulgarian expatriate sportspeople in Germany
Bulgarian expatriate sportspeople in Israel
Bulgarian expatriate sportspeople in Greece